The Peshawar–Kabul–Dushanbe motorway is a proposed motorway it will link Dushanbe to the port city of Karachi, via Khyber Pass the planned Peshawar–Kabul–Dushanbe motorway is a part of Khyber Pass Economic Corridor.

Khyber Pass Economic Corridor 
Peshawar–Kabul–Dushanbe motorway is part of Khyber Pass Economic Corridor.

Details 
It is expected to become a vital link to Afghanistan and Central Asia. It will be part of the Pakistan's Motorway Network. On March 4, 2015, the Pakistan government informed the National Assembly that a technical feasibility to construct the motorway was under consideration.

Sections 
The motorway would be divided into three parts, 50 km long Peshawar-Torkham, 76 km Torkham-Jalalabad and 139 km Jalalabad-Kabul last section will be Kabul to Dushanbe.

See also
Motorways of Pakistan
National Highways of Pakistan
Transport in Pakistan
National Highway Authority

References

External links

AH1
Motorways in Pakistan
Khyber Pass Economic Corridor